Saif Gaddafi is probably an abbreviation of one of the following sons of Muammar Gaddafi:

Saif al-Islam Gaddafi (b. 1972)
Saif al-Arab Gaddafi (1982–2011)